The Mifflin School, built in 1825, is the oldest surviving school building used in the Philadelphia public school system. It is a two-story, two-bay red brick building, which now has its side walls stuccoed over.  In the first phase of the development of the public school system in Philadelphia, 1818–1850, simple school buildings were built by local authorities in a decentralized system.  During this period, 49 buildings were built by 7 local school boards, with only 4 surviving.

References

School buildings on the National Register of Historic Places in Philadelphia
School buildings completed in 1825
Northern Liberties, Philadelphia